Mycoobacterium iranicum  is a bacterium from the genus Mycobacterium which has been isolated from a patient from Isfahan in Iran. Eight strains have been isolated from patients from various countries.

References

Further reading

External links
Type strain of Mycobacterium iranicum at BacDive -  the Bacterial Diversity Metadatabase

iranicum
Bacteria described in 2013